Army Detachment Kempf was an army-sized formation of the Wehrmacht on the Eastern Front during World War II.  As part of Army Group South, Detachment Kempf saw action during Operation Citadel, the German attempt to cut off the Kursk salient and destroy a large part of the Soviet Army.

Operational history
The detachment was formed on 1 February 1943 as Armee-Abteilung Lanz, led by Hubert Lanz. On 21 February 1943 Lanz was replaced by Werner Kempf and the detachment was renamed to reflect this change. In February–March that year, The detachment fought in the Third Battle of Kharkov.

The detachment took part in the Battle of Kursk. Beginning on the night of 4/5 July 1943, the III Panzer Corps, the detachment's primary attack formation, spearheaded the thrust east of Belgorod. After the failure of the operation, Army Detachment Kempf retreated with the rest of Army Group South. Kempf was relieved of command on 17 August 1943. He was replaced by Otto Wöhler on August 16 and the detachment was designated as the 8th Army.

The order of battle for Operation Citadel was:

III Panzer Corps: 6th, 7th, & 19th Panzer Divisions, 168th Infantry Division
XI Army Corps: 106th, 198th, 320th Infantry Divisions
XLII Army Corps: 39th, 161st, 282nd Infantry Divisions

Commander

References

Military units and formations of the German Army in World War II
Military units and formations established in 1943
Military units and formations disestablished in 1943